Gran Hermano ("Big Brother" in Spanish) is the name of several versions of the reality TV series Big Brother. It may refer to:

 Gran Hermano (Argentina)
 Gran Hermano (Colombia)
 Gran Hermano (Ecuador)
 Gran Hermano (Pacific) (Ecuador, Chile and Peru)
 Gran Hermano (Spain)
 Gran Hermano (U.S.)

See also
Big Brother (TV series), the international franchise
Big Brother (disambiguation)